James GilmourBirth Certificate: Scotland's People GROS Ref B1906 282-04 172 Thompson (January 20, 1906 – January 26, 1966) was a Scottish-born Canadian freestyle swimmer who won a bronze medal in the 4×200-metre freestyle relay at the 1928 Summer Olympics in Amsterdam; he also competed in the 400-metre and 1500-metre freestyle events, but failed to reach the finals.  Two years later he won a gold medal in the 4×200-yard freestyle relay at the 1930 British Empire Games.

Thompson was born in Scotland and in the early 1920s moved to Canada, where he started training in swimming at the Toronto YMCA club. In 1928 the Canadian Olympic Committee selected him for the Olympics as a fourth team member, but could sponsor only three swimmers. Thompson, a machinist by profession, had modest incomes and had to seek sponsors to attend the Games.  Later he initiated a government-sponsored swimming program for poor, and between 1932 and 1966 worked as the head coach of the Hamilton Aquatic Club.  He was named Hamilton's Citizen of the Year in 1959, Canada's Swimming Coach of the Year in 1964, and was inducted into the Hamilton Sports and Ontario Aquatic Halls of Fame. Hamilton's Jimmy Thompson Memorial Swimming Pool carried his name.  He died of cancer in 1966.

His daughter Patty also became Olympic swimmer, whereas his son Robert competed in water polo.

See also
 List of Commonwealth Games medallists in swimming (men)
 List of Olympic medalists in swimming (men)

References

External links
Jimmy Thompson's family pushes to keep pool named in his honour 
Jimmy Thompson ‐ Hamilton Aquatics Club Founder and Coach
Article on Jimmy Thompson, and his daughter, Patty

1906 births
1966 deaths
Sportspeople from Dundee
British emigrants to Canada
Canadian male freestyle swimmers
Commonwealth Games gold medallists for Canada
Olympic bronze medalists for Canada
Olympic bronze medalists in swimming
Olympic swimmers of Canada
Swimmers at the 1928 Summer Olympics
Swimmers at the 1930 British Empire Games
Medalists at the 1928 Summer Olympics
Commonwealth Games medallists in swimming
Sportspeople from Hamilton, Ontario
Medallists at the 1930 British Empire Games